Preaek Preah Sdach (ឃុំព្រែកព្រះស្តេច) is a khum (commune) of Battambang District in Battambang Province in north-western Cambodia.

Villages
Preaek Preah Sdach contains eight villages.

References

Communes of Battambang province
Battambang District